Sanaye Giti Pasand Isfahan Football Club is an Iranian football club based in Isfahan, Iran. They currently compete in the Azadegan League. The club is known for its Futsal team, which is one of the best in Asia.

Season-by-season
The table below shows the achievements of the club in various competitions.

Achievements

Domestic
 Iran Football's 2nd Division:
Promoted (1): 2012–13
 Iran Football's 3rd Division:
Promoted (1): 2010–11

Highlights
Giti Pasand was established in 2010 their first year they promoted to 2nd Division and were on a great form with good spending and buying players from other leagues. In a one-year gap Giti Pasand promoted to Azadegan League, with scoring the second most in the league. In 2014 Giti Pasand made great signing including Mohammad Salsali the Persian Gulf Cup side Zob Ahan F.C. Captain and one of their best players which made a huge affectionate to Giti Pasand and helped them.

Current squad

See also
 2011–12 Hazfi Cup
 2011–12 Iran Football's 2nd Division
 Giti Pasand Futsal Club
 Giti Pasand Novin Futsal Club

External links
 
 Giti pasand Fan Club website

References
1. https://int.soccerway.com/teams/iran/giti-pasand/25244/

2. http://www.persianleague.com/

3. http://www.persianleague.com/index.php/teams/teams?id=118&view=team&sid=35

Football clubs in Iran
Association football clubs established in 2010
Sport in Isfahan
Association football clubs disestablished in 2016
Defunct football clubs in Iran
2010 establishments in Iran